Siarhei Novikau may refer to:
Siarhei Novikau (boxer) (born 1989), Belarusian boxer
Siarhei Novikau (judoka) (born 1982), Belarusian judoka

See also
Sergey Novikov (disambiguation)